Las Lajas may refer to:

 Las Lajas (volcano), a volcano in the central part of Nicaragua
 Las Lajas, Catamarca, a village in Argentina
 Las Lajas, Neuquén, a town in Argentina
 Las Lajas, Cuba, a settlement in Guantánamo
 Las Lajas, Honduras, a town
 Las Lajas, Chiriquí, a corregimiento in Panama
 Las Lajas, Panamá Oeste, a corregimiento in Panama
 Las Lajas Canton, El Oro Province, Ecuador
 Las Lajas Shrine, a cathedral in Ipiales, Colombia

See also
 Lajas (disambiguation)